ARA Los Andes was one of two s built in Britain in the 1870s for the Argentine Navy.

Description
They displaced , and their crew numbered 120 officers and enlisted men.

History

References

Notes

Bibliography

External links 
 

1875 ships
El Plata-class monitors
Ships built in Leamouth